Michael Anthony Sims-Walker (born Michael Anthony Walker on November 21, 1984) is a former American football wide receiver. He most recently played for the Winnipeg Blue Bombers of the Canadian Football League. He was drafted by the Jacksonville Jaguars in the third round of the 2007 NFL Draft. He played college football at UCF.

Sims-Walker also played for the St. Louis Rams.

Early years
Sims-Walker played high school football at Edgewater High School in Orlando, Florida.

College career
Sims-Walker played college football at UCF, where he was a teammate of fellow NFL receiver Brandon Marshall.

Sims-Walker played in 12 games as a true freshman and has 21 receptions for 337 yards.  During his sophomore year, he played six games at cornerback due to injuries to the team.  He had 9 catches for 191 yards, and also had three interceptions while playing defense.  During his junior year, he played exclusively as wide receiver and ranked second on the team with 64 receptions for 855 yards and 9 touchdowns.  During his senior year, he set the UCF record for most receptions in a single season with 90.  He was a two-time All-Conference USA Selection during his collegiate career.  He played in a total of 46 career games with 184 receptions for 2,561 yards (13.9 ypc average).

Professional career

2007 NFL Draft

Jacksonville Jaguars
Sims-Walker was drafted by the Jaguars in the third round of the 2007 NFL Draft. He was unable to play during his first season because of a knee injury suffered in the fourth preseason game against the Washington Redskins.

In 2008, he played in nine games posting 16 receptions for 217 yards.

In 2009, Sims-Walker rebounded to become the Jaguars' leader in receptions (63) and receiving yards (869).

St. Louis Rams
After the 2010-2011 season, Sims-Walker became a free agent.  On July 29, 2011, he was signed by the St. Louis Rams. He was released on October 17, 2011.

Return to Jacksonville
On October 19, Sims-Walker re-signed with the Jacksonville Jaguars. He was placed on the injured reserve list on November 2, ending his season. He was released from the injured reserve list on December 4, 2011.

Winnipeg Blue Bombers
On August 27, 2013, Sims-Walker signed with the Winnipeg Blue Bombers of the Canadian Football League. He signed with the Bombers halfway through the 2013 CFL season. He was released by the Blue Bombers on March 6, 2014.

Personal life
In 2009, Walker officially changed his surname to Sims-Walker to honor his father, Michael Sims, who died from colon cancer on December 6, 2008. In 2010, he created the Mike Sims-Walker Foundation to honor his father. Through his foundation, he launched the Playmaker 11 Scholarship that provided 10 $200 one-time book stipends and one $1,000 book stipend to graduating high school seniors in the Jacksonville-area and his hometown of Orlando, Florida.

Sims-Walker is the uncle of Jeff Sims, the current starting quarterback for the Georgia Tech Yellow Jackets.

In popular culture

Video games
Sims-Walker, along with fellow Orlando native and NFL player Chris Johnson, has a unique celebration animation, the "Chopper City Juke," in Madden NFL 11.

References

External links

UCF Knights bio

1984 births
Living people
Players of American football from Orlando, Florida
Players of Canadian football from Orlando, Florida
American football wide receivers
UCF Knights football players
Jacksonville Jaguars players
St. Louis Rams players
Winnipeg Blue Bombers players